Barralet is a surname. Notable people with the surname include:

John James Barralet ( 1747–1815), Irish artist
James Barralet, British cellist

See also
Barrales